This is a list of shipyards in Australia:-

 Adelaide Steamship Company (Birkenhead, South Australia) Built tugs. (1957–1973)
 Austal (Henderson, Western Australia) Large and mid sized catamaran ferries, small naval vessels. (1988–present)
 ASC (Osborne North, South Australia) Submarines, destroyers, patrol boats. (1985–present)
ASC Shipbuilding (Osborne South, South Australia) Subsidiary of BAE Systems Australia until end of Hunter-class frigates will then be returned to ASC Pty Ltd. (2018–present)
 BAE Systems Australia (Henderson, Western Australia and Williamstown, Victoria)
 BHP Limited (Whyalla, South Australia) (1939–1978)
 Cockatoo Docks & Engineering Company (Cockatoo Island Dockyard, Sydney, New South Wales) (1870–1992)
 Evans Deakin & Company (Brisbane, Queensland) Small naval vessels, trawlers, steamers, bulk carriers, tankers, tugs (1940–1971)
 Forgacs Group (Newcastle, New South Wales) Formerly known as Carrington Slipways. Naval vessels, ferries. (1957–2014)
 Green Point Naval Boatyard Green Point, Mortlake, New South Wales (1940s)
 Harwood Marine (Harwood, New South Wales) Aluminium and steel small naval vessels, trawlers, freighters, commercial tourist and ferries (1970 – present)
 Incat (Hobart, Tasmania) Large and mid sized catamaran ferries. (1977–present)
 John Wright and Son Shipyards, (Tuncurry, New South Wales) (1875–1958)
 Morrison & Sinclair (Sydney) Naval vessels, trading and merchant ships, ferries, yachts (1890s – 1970)
 Mort's Dock (Sydney) (1855–1959)
 Norman R Wright & Sons (Brisbane)
 NQEA (Cairns, Queensland)
 Osborne Naval Shipyard at Osborne, South Australia, the original home of the Australian Submarine Corporation
 Poole & Steel (Sydney, New South Wales) (1912–1954)
 Richardson Devine Marine (Hobart, Tasmania) Aluminium ferries under 45 metres. (1989–present)
 State Dockyard (Newcastle, New South Wales) (1942–1987)
 Strategic Marine (Henderson, Western Australia)
 Walkers Limited (Maryborough, Queensland) (1884–1974)
 Walsh Island Dockyard & Engineering Works (Newcastle, New South Wales) (1913–1933)

See also
 List of ports in Australia

Shipyards
 
Shipyards